Pain Karu Kola (also Romanized as Pā’īn Karū Kolā) is a village in Karipey Rural District, Lalehabad District, Babol County, Mazandaran Province, Iran. At the 2006 census, its population was 551, in 146 families.

References 

Populated places in Babol County